The 2001 Indian Parliament attack was a terrorist attack on the Parliament of India in New Delhi, India on 13 December 2001. The perpetrators belonged to Lashkar-e-Taiba (LeT) and Jaish-e-Mohammed (JeM) - two Pakistan-raised terrorist organisations. The attack led to the deaths of six Delhi Police personnel, two Parliament Security Service personnel, and a gardenerin total 9and led to increased tensions between India and Pakistan, resulting in the 2001–2002 India–Pakistan standoff. The five terrorists were killed outside the parliament.

Attack
On 13 December 2001, five terrorists infiltrated the Parliament House in a car with Home Ministry and Parliament labels. While both the Rajya Sabha and Lok Sabha had been adjourned 40 minutes prior to the incident, many members of parliament (MPs) and government officials such as Home Minister LK Advani and Minister of State for Defence Harin Pathak were believed to have still been in the building at the time of the attack. More than 100 people, including major politicians, were inside the parliament building at the time. The gunmen used a fake identity sticker on the car they drove and thus easily breached the security deployed around the parliamentary complex. The terrorists carried AK-47 rifles, grenade launchers, pistols and grenades.

The gunmen drove their vehicle into the car of the Indian Vice President Krishan Kant (who was in the building at the time), got out, and began shooting. The Vice President's guards and security personnel shot back at the terrorists and then started closing the gates of the compound. A similar attack was carried out on the assembly of Srinagar, Jammu and Kashmir, in November 2001, killing 38 people.

Delhi Police officials said that gunmen received instructions from Pakistan and the operation was carried out under the guidance of Pakistan's Inter-Services Intelligence (ISI) agency. In their book The Exile: The Flight of Osama bin Laden, Cathy Scott-Clark and Adrian Levy state that then-CIA station chief Robert Grenier and Ambassador Wendy Chamberlin suspected that the ISI had approved the attack in order to force the redeployment of troops under the command of Ali Jan Aurakzai away from the Durand Line, allowing Osama bin Laden to escape into Pakistan during the Battle of Tora Bora.

Casualties
Constable Kamlesh Kumari of the Central Reserve Police Force was the first to spot the terrorists and was shot by them as she raised the alarm. She died on the spot. One gunman's suicide vest exploded when he was shot dead; the other four gunmen were also killed. The ministers and MPs escaped unhurt. The total number killed was 9 and at least 17 other people were injured in the attack.

Perpetrators
Delhi Police stated that five terrorists carried out the attack and the names given by them were: Hamza, Haider alias Tufail, Rana, Ranvijay and Mohammed - who were members of Jaish-e-Mohammed - were killed.

Trial
The attack triggered extensive investigations, which revealed the involvement of four accused, namely Mohammad Afzal Guru, Shaukat Hussain Guru (cousin of Afzal Guru) and S.A.R. Geelani (Syed Abdul Rahman Geelani) (also spelled "Gilani") and Shaukat's wife Afsan Guru (Navjot Sandhu before marriage). Some other proclaimed offenders were said to be the leaders of the banned terrorist organisation known as Jaish-e-Mohammed. After the conclusion of investigation, investigating agency filed the report under Section 173 of Criminal Procedure Code, 1973 (India) against four accused persons on 14 May 2002. Charges were framed under various sections of Indian Penal Code (IPC), the Prevention of Terrorism Act, 2002 (POTA), and the Explosive Substances Act by the designated sessions Court.

The designated Special Court was presided over by S. N. Dhingra. The accused were tried and the trial concluded within a record period of about six months. 80 witnesses were examined for the prosecution and 10 witnesses were examined on behalf of the accused S.A.R. Geelani. About 300 documents were exhibited. Afzal Guru, Shaukat Hussain and S.A.R. Geelani were convicted for the offences under Sections 121, 121A, 122, Section 120B read with Sections 302 & 307 read with Section 120B of IPC, sub-Sections (2), (3) and (5) of Section 3 and Section 4(b) of POTA and Sections 3 and 4 of Explosive Substances Act. The accused 1 and 2 were also convicted under Section 3(4) of POTA.

Accused 4, namely Navjot Sandhu a.k.a. Afsan, was acquitted of all the charges except the one under Section 123 IPC for which she was convicted and sentenced to undergo rigorous imprisonment for five years and to pay a fine. Death sentences were imposed on the other three accused for the offences under Section 302 read with Section 120B IPC and Section 3(2) of POTA. They were also sentenced to life imprisonment on as many as eight counts under the provisions of IPC, POTA and Explosive Substances Act in addition to varying amounts of fine. The amount of a million Indian rupees, which was recovered from the possession of two of the accused, namely, Afzal Guru and Shaukat Hussain, was forfeited to the State under Section 6 of the POTA.

On appeal, the high court subsequently acquitted S. A. R. Geelani and Afsan, but upheld Shaukat's and Afzal's death sentence. Geelani was represented by Ram Jethmalani in the Delhi High Court and subsequently in the Supreme Court of India. Jethmalani said it almost cost him his political career for defending Geelani. Geelani's acquittal blew a gaping hole in the prosecution's version of the parliament attack. He was presented as the mastermind of the entire attack. Geelani, a young lecturer at Delhi University, received support from his outraged colleagues and friends, who were certain that he had been framed. They contacted the well-known lawyer Nandita Haksar and asked her to take on his case.

Shaukat Hussain was released nine months prior to his scheduled date of release, because of his "good conduct".

Two Delhi Police officials, ACP Rajbir Singh and Mohan Chand Sharma are credited for gathering prima facie evidence in the case. Singh was later shot dead by a friend over a property deal and Sharma was killed during the Batla House encounter with terrorists in Delhi.

Response

The Indian Government initially accused Lashkar-e-Taiba and Jaish-e-Mohammed of involvement in the attack. However, Lashkar-e-Taiba denied any involvement in the incident. In November 2002, four JeM members were arrested by Indian authorities and put on trial. All four were found guilty of playing various roles in the incident, although the fourth, Afsan/Navjot Sandhu, wife of Shaukat Hussain (one of the accused) was found guilty of a minor charge of concealing knowledge of conspiracy. One of the accused, Afzal Guru, was sentenced to death for the incident.

World leaders and leaders in India's immediate neighbourhood condemned the attack on the Parliament. On 14 December, the ruling National Democratic Alliance (NDA) blamed Pakistan-based Lashkar-e-Taiba and Jaish-e-Mohammed for the attack. Home Minister LK Advani claimed, "We have received some clues about yesterday's incident, which shows that a neighbouring country, and some terrorist organisations active there behind it", in an indirect reference to Pakistan and Pakistan-based terrorist groups.

The same day, in a demarche to Pakistani High Commissioner to India, Ashraf Jehangir Qazi, India demanded that Pakistan stop the activities of LeT and JeM, that Pakistan apprehend the organisations' leaders and that Pakistan curb the financial assets and the groups' access to these assets. In response to the Indian government's statements, Pakistani forces were put on high alert the same day. On 20 December, India mobilised and deployed its troops to Kashmir and Punjab in what was India's largest military mobilisation since the 1971 Indo-Pakistani War.

Following the attack, many suspects were arrested, and in December 2002 four Jaish-e-Mohammed members were convicted for roles in the attack. In 2003, the Border Security Force (BSF) killed Ghazi Baba, the commander-in-chief of Jaish-e-Mohammed and the mastermind of the attack, in the Noor Bagh neighborhood of Srinagar, Jammu and Kashmir.

Afzal Guru, sentenced to death by Indian court and due to be hanged on 20 October 2006, had his execution stayed. His family had camped in New Delhi to meet the President Dr. A.P.J Abdul Kalam to accept the mercy petition. The family of Kamlesh Kumari Jatav, a CRPF Jawan who died in the attack has said that they would return the Ashok Chakra, if the president accepted the petition, and on 13 December 2006, the families of the deceased returned the medals to the government. As of April 2007, the then President of India, A.P.J. Abdul Kalam, refused to interfere in the judicial process.

The sentence was scheduled to be carried out on 20 October 2006, but Afzal was given a stay of execution and remained on death row. On 3 February 2013, his mercy petition was rejected by the then President of India Pranab Mukherjee. He was hanged in Delhi's Tihar Jail at 8:00 A.M. on 9 February 2013, and buried in Tihar jail with full religious rites.

In popular culture 
Special OPS: The 2020 Indian action espionage thriller web series from Hotstar Specials created and directed by Neeraj Pandey and starring Kay Kay Menon in the lead role was based on the attacks. In 2022, another movie was released called Attack: Part 1 was also partially based on the attacks.

See also

 List of Islamist terrorist attacks
 List of terrorist incidents in India
List of attacks on legislatures
 Islamic terrorism
 Special OPS
 2001 Jammu and Kashmir legislative assembly car bombing
 Pakistan and state terrorism
 2014 shootings at Parliament Hill, a similar attack that occurred in Ottawa, Canada
 2017 Tehran attacks, which included an attack on the Iranian Parliament by gunmen and suicide bombers.
 2021 storming of the United States Capitol

References

External links
 
 Parliament attack: Why didn't the bomb explode? Afzal Guru wonders
 Book review: The Strange Case of the Attack on the Indian Parliament
 Unanswered questions are the remains of the day

2001 in international relations
2001 in politics
2001 mass shootings in Asia
2001 murders in Asia
2000s in Delhi
2001 murders in India
2000s trials
21st-century mass murder in India
Attacks on buildings and structures in 2001
Attacks on buildings and structures in India
Attacks on legislatures
December 2001 crimes
December 2001 events in India
Islamic terrorism in India
2001 Parliament attack
Mass murder in 2001
Mass shootings in India
Murder in Delhi
Murder–suicides in Asia
Murder trials
2001 attack
Suicide bombings in 2001
Suicide bombings in India
Parliament attack
2001 Parliament attack